German submarine U-1197 was a Type VIIC U-boat of Nazi Germany's Kriegsmarine during World War II.

She was ordered on 25 August 1941, and was laid down on 13 March 1943 at F Schichau GmbH, Danzig, as yard number 1567. She was launched on 30 September 1943 and commissioned under the command of Leutnant zur See Heinz Baum on 2 December 1943.

Design
German Type VIIC submarines were preceded by the shorter Type VIIB submarines. U-1197 had a displacement of  when at the surface and  while submerged. She had two shafts and two  propellers.

U-1197 was fitted with five  torpedo tubes (four fitted at the bow and one at the stern), fourteen torpedoes or 26 TMA mines, one  SK C/35 naval gun, (220 rounds), one  Flak M42 and two twin  C/30 anti-aircraft guns. The boat had a complement of between 44 — 52 men.

Service history
U-1197 was badly damaged during a US 8th AF raid on the Deschimag AG Weser shipyard in Bremen on 30 March 1945. Due to the heavy bomb damage U-1197 was decommissioned on 25 April 1945 at Wesermünde.

U-1197 was captured by British forces, still at Wesermünde in May 1945.

In February 1946, U-1197 was sunk by the US Navy in the North Sea.

References

Bibliography

External links

German Type VIIC submarines
U-boats commissioned in 1943
World War II submarines of Germany
Ships built in Danzig
1943 ships
Maritime incidents in March 1945
Maritime incidents in May 1945
Maritime incidents in 1946
World War II shipwrecks in the North Sea
Ships built by Schichau